Weightlifting at the 1964 Summer Paralympics consisted of four events for men held 09 - 12 November 1964.

Participating nations 
There were 18 male competitors representing 10 nations.

Medal summary

Medal table 
There were 12 medal winners representing six nations.

Men's events

References 

 

1964 Summer Paralympics events
1964
Paralympics